Tajh Romell Bellow (born February 9, 1995) is an American actor. He is best known for his role on General Hospital as TJ Ashford. In 2021, Bellow was nominated for a Daytime Emmy Award Outstanding Younger Performer in a Drama Series.

Personal life and education
Bellow is the son of Alvin Bellow, Jr. and Latasha Rene Bellow (née Kimble). He has two siblings, Kahree and Maya. Born in Texas City, Texas, Bellow relocated to Katy, Texas, just outside of Houston when he was 7 years old. Bellow relocated to California at age 12 to pursue his acting career. Bellow attended Burbank High School in Burbank, California. As a sophomore, Bellow took the California High School Proficiency Exam to test out of high school as balancing school with work proved nearly impossible. He stayed until his junior to continue playing tennis. At 17, Bellow attended community college for 7 years as he tried to balance school with his acting career. In the fall of 2019, Bellow transferred to California State University as a sociology major. In the summer of 2018, Bellow attended a Shakespearian intensive at Magdalen College, Oxford which he credited with renewing his love for acting. As of 2022, he left California State and has enrolled in the Los Angeles Film School.

In February 2020, Bellow suffered a torn quadricep. The injury was incorporated into his character's storyline on General Hospital.

Career
Bellow started acting professionally at age 12, in 2007 after he was discovered by a talent scout. He booked his first role in 2008 with the short film, Don't Touch If You Ain't Prayed 2. Bellow would also make his feature film debut that year in the comedy Role Models, which starred Seann William Scott and Paul Rudd. Bellow has appeared in primetime series such as Bosch, Filthy Preppy Teens, The Middle, K.C. Undercover and Girl Meets World. Bellow joined the cast of General Hospital as a recast of TJ Ashford on November 20, 2018. Bellow had auditioned for the role twice before, in 2012 and in 2016, before he finally booked the role in 2018. In October 2019, Bellow booked a guest role in an episode of the children's sitcom Bunk'd. In 2021, Bellow guest-starred in an episode of NCIS. In 2022, Bellow was placed on contract at General Hospital.

Filmography

Awards and nominations

References

External links
 

American male television actors
1995 births
American male soap opera actors
Living people
Male actors from Houston
21st-century American male actors